Shingo Kunieda defeated Alfie Hewett in the final, 7–5, 3–6, 6–2 to win the men's singles wheelchair title at the 2022 Australian Open. It was his eleventh Australian Open singles title and his record-extending 26th major singles title overall.

Joachim Gérard was the defending champion, but was defeated by Kunieda in the quarterfinals.

Seeds

Draw

Bracket

References

External links
 Drawsheet on ausopen.com

Wheelchair Men's Singles
2022 Men's Singles